Fairfield is an unincorporated area in northwest Harris County, Texas, with about  of area. It is near U.S. Route 290 and Mason Road.  there were 3,652 households.

Composition
 the housing prices ranged started at $130,000 and ended in the $700,000s.

Education
The Cypress-Fairbanks Independent School District operates public schools.

In 1998 the zoned schools were Ault Elementary School, Arnold Middle School, and Cy-Fair High School. By 2002 Goodson Middle School had opened, taking territory from Arnold Middle. By 2007 Keith Elementary School had opened and began serving portions of Fairfield, along with Ault. All residents were zoned to another middle school, Spillane Middle School. Cy Woods High School, along with Cy-Fair High, now served the community. By 2012 another elementary school began serving Fairfield along with Ault and Keith, Swenke Elementary. In addition Salyards Middle School had been built in Fairfield, and Cy-Ranch High School became the local high school.

Commerce
Area shopping centers include Fairfield Towne Center and Houston Premium Outlets.

References

External links
 Fairfield - Friendswood Development Company
  - Website from Friendswood Development Company
 Fairfield Sports Association

Unincorporated communities in Texas
Unincorporated communities in Harris County, Texas